HMS Cockchafer was a United States schooner, formerly named Spencer, that the Royal Navy (RN) captured and employed as a ship's tender. She captured two American armed brigs, one in a single-ship action. The Navy sold her in 1815.

Origins and capture
Cockchafers origins are a little uncertain.

One source describes her as the United States' letter of marque Spence, launched in 1811 that  captured on 3 August 1812. A listing of American vessels captured by the Royal Navy described Spence as a schooner of two guns that the boats of Maidstone and  captured in the Little River, Bay of Fundy, together with three other armed vessels. The main part of the vessels' crews escaped. A source on United States privateers gives her master's name as Tucker and describes her as a boat.

The Cockchafer was the former schooner Spencer, of eight guns. The Royal Navy had a practice of not having two vessels with the same name in commission at the same time. The schooner could not retain the name Spencer in Royal Navy service because of the 74-gun , which was in service from 1800 to 1822.

There was a United States' letter of marque named Spencer, a schooner of 169 tons (bm), but she was recommissioned in October 1813, and there is no record of her having ever been captured.

Lastly, Maidstone was one of the vessels that shared in the capture on 1 February 1813 of a schooner named Spencer. Unfortunately, her capture was not adjudicated in the Vice admiralty court at Halifax so currently nothing is known about her except her name and those of her captors.

Royal Navy
Lieutenant George Urmston commissioned Cockchafer in early 1813.

The next day they landed troops under Lieutenant Colonel Napier of the 102nd Regiment of Foot. The two tenders and number of smaller vessels were in the third division.

The squadron faced resistance from a brig and a schooner, the only American armed vessels. The first division, under Lieutenant Westphall, came in under covering fire from Congreve rockets and captured the two American vessels. These two were Atlas and Anaconda, both letters of marque. Anaconda was a brig-sloop of 18 long 9-pounder guns and a crew of 160, with a home port of New York City. Atlas, of 10 guns and 240 tons, had a home port of Philadelphia. Both subsequently entered the Royal Navy.  retained her own name; Atlas became the 14-gun schooner . While the navy was capturing the American vessels, the troops captured Portsmouth and Ocracoke islands.

Cockchafer was among the vessels that captured vegetables and provisions on the Chesapeake on 23 October 1813, 15 November, and 27 December, for which prize money was paid.

Cockchafer, Lieutenant Charles Blood, was among the vessels that shared in the prize money for the brig Regulator, Wright, master, captured on 22 November 1813.

Cockchafer, Lieutenant Charles Blood, was among the vessels that shared in the prize money for the brigs George, Crocker, master, and Betsey, Percival, master, captured on 23 December 1813.

In March 1814 Mr. George Jackson assumed command of Cockchafer.  

Cockchafer was sent to Nassau, New Providence, to protect the coasting-trade, and to escort convoys to Havana and the Gulf of Mexico. 

They were carrying British Agent Woodbine (an honorary captain in the Corps of Colonial Marines) and supplies to Britain's Creek, Chocktaw, and other allies there.

Cockchaser then carried despatches for the Commander-in-Chief in the Chesapeake, and on her arrival there she was ordered up the Potomac to assist the British in their descent of that river, after the capture of Alexandria. 

Jackson subsequently led the starboard division in the Battle of Baltimore (September 12–15, 1814), on which occasion he took soundings. Cockchafer was part of the Royal Navy's bombardment squadron. When American cannon fire shredded her sails Admiral Cochrane had her withdraw. 

Cockchafer returned New Providence, convoying a brig carrying government stores and presents for the Indian chiefs. 

On 3 December 1814 Cockchafer captured the United States' letter of marque Aurora, of Wisscasset, Maine.  Aurora was a schooner of four guns and 20 men, or ten 9-pounder guns and 28 men. 

Cockchafer captured the brig Java, of 160 tons (bm), on 20 December 1814. US sources stated that Cockchafer, 22 men, Lieutenant George Jackson, was cruising off the Chesapeake when in May 1814 she captured the American letter-of-marque Java, of eight 9-pounder guns and 22 men, after a long engagement.

In all Cockchafer captured six American vessels, including Aurora and Java.

Fate

The Royal Navy sold Cockchafer in late 1815 at the Royal Naval Dockyard on Ireland Island in the Imperial fortress colony of Bermuda.

Notes

Citations

References
 
 
 
 
 

1811 ships
Ships built in the United States
Captured ships
Schooners of the Royal Navy